Kim Seong-han (January 17, 1919 – September 6, 2010) was a South Korean novelist.

Awards
 The Dong-in Literary Award (1956)

References 

South Korean novelists
South Korean journalists
University of Tokyo alumni
Alumni of the University of Manchester
People from South Hamgyong
1919 births
2010 deaths